The United Nations Educational, Scientific and Cultural Organisation (UNESCO) intangible cultural heritage elements are the non-physical traditions and practices performed by a people. As part of a country's cultural heritage, they include celebrations, festivals, performances, oral traditions, music, and the making of handicrafts. The "intangible cultural heritage" is defined by the Convention for the Safeguarding of Intangible Cultural Heritage, drafted in 2003 and took effect in 2006. Inscription of new heritage elements on the UNESCO Intangible Cultural Heritage Lists is determined by the Intergovernmental Committee for the Safeguarding of Intangible Cultural Heritage, an organisation established by the convention.

Eastern Europe, as designated by the United Nations Statistics Division (UNSD), consists of ten countries. The groupings used by the UNSD are not indicative of "any assumption regarding political or other affiliation of countries or territories."  All of the countries, with the exception of Russia, are state parties to the Convention for the Safeguarding of Intangible Cultural Heritage. Four intangible cultural heritage elements have been inscribed as elements of the Czech Republic, Poland, and Ukraine, two as elements of Bulgaria, Hungary, Romania, and Russia,  one for Belarus and Slovakia, and none for Moldova.

Gallery

List of intangible heritage elements
The table lists information about each International Cultural Heritage element:
Name: official name, worded as inscribed on the list
Region: region within or outside a country where a heritage is still practiced
Country: country, as inscribed on the list
Year: the year the site was inscribed on the Intangible Cultural Heritage List
Session: the session and decision in which a heritage is inscribed by the committee
Description: brief description of the heritage

See also
List of World Heritage Sites in Eastern Europe

Notes

References

External links
UNESCO Intangible Cultural Heritage: Official site
UNESCO Convention for the Safeguarding of Intangible Cultural Heritage: Text of the convention

 Eastern Europe
Eastern Europe
Eastern Europe
Europe-related lists
Tourism in Eastern Europe